Jean Coutu,  (born May 29, 1927) is a Canadian pharmacist and businessman. He is the founder and chairman of the Jean Coutu Group which he started in 1969. With an estimated net worth of $US 2.3 billion (as of 2015), Coutu was ranked by Forbes as the 22nd wealthiest Canadian and 938th wealthiest person in the world.

In 1993, he was made an Officer of the Order of Canada and an Officer of the National Order of Quebec.

Philanthropy

Jean Coutu founded the Marcelle and Jean Coutu Foundation which mainly supports numerous causes such as poverty, women and child abuse, education, and the fight against drug addiction in Canada. It has contributed to multiple organizations, including:
Autism research
Centraide
Fondation Le Pilier
Mira
Moisson Montréal
SunYouth
The Montreal Children's Hospital

References

External links
 Jean Coutu at The Canadian Encyclopedia

1927 births
Living people
Businesspeople from Montreal
Officers of the National Order of Quebec
Officers of the Order of Canada
Canadian pharmacists
Canadian billionaires
Université de Montréal alumni